Paula Scher (born October 6, 1948, Washington, D.C.) is an American graphic designer, painter and art educator in design. She also served as the first female principal at Pentagram, which she joined in 1991.

Education
Scher studied at the Tyler School of Art, in Elkins Park, Pennsylvania and earned a Bachelor of Fine Arts in 1970.

Life and career

Scher moved to New York City and took her first job as a layout artist for Random House's children's book division.

CBS Records
In 1972, she was hired by CBS Records to the advertising and promotions department.  After two years, she left CBS Records to pursue a more creative endeavor at a competing label, Atlantic Records, where she became the art director, designing her first album covers.  A year later Scher returned to CBS as an art director for the cover department.  During her eight years at CBS Records, she is credited with designing as many as 150 album covers a year.  Some of those iconic album cover designs are Boston (Boston), Eric Gale (Ginseng Woman), Leonard Bernstein (Poulenc Stravinsky), Bob James (H), Bob James and Earl Klugh (One on One), Roger Dean and David Howells (The Ultimate Album Cover Album) and Jean-Pierre Rampal and Lily Laskin (Sakura: Japanese Melodies  for Flute and Harp). Her designs were recognized with four Grammy nominations. She is also credited with reviving historical typefaces and design styles. (H.K)

Russian constructivism
She left Atlantic Records to work on her own in 1982. Scher developed a typographic solution based on Art Deco and Russian constructivism, which incorporated outmoded typefaces into her work.  The Russian constructivism had provided Scher inspiration for her typography; she didn't copy the early constructivist style but used its vocabulary of form on her works.

Koppel & Scher
In 1984 she co-founded Koppel & Scher with editorial designer and fellow Tyler graduate Terry Koppel.  During the seven years of their partnership, she produced identities, packaging, book jackets, and advertising, including the famous Swatch poster.

Pentagram
In 1991, after the studio suffered from the recession and Koppel took the position of Creative Director at Esquire magazine, Scher began consulting and joined Pentagram as a partner in the New York office.  Since then, she has been a principal at the New York office of the Pentagram design consultancy, where she has developed identity and branding systems, promotional materials, environmental graphics, packaging and publication designs for a broad range of clients that includes, among others, Bloomberg, Microsoft, Bausch + Lomb, Coca-Cola, Shake Shack, The New School, the Museum of Modern Art, the Sundance Institute, the High Line, Jazz at Lincoln Center, the Metropolitan Opera, the New York City Ballet, the New York Philharmonic, the New Jersey Performing Arts Center, the United States Holocaust Memorial Museum, the Philadelphia Museum of Art, and the New York City Department of Parks and Recreation.

Educator
In 1992, she became a design educator, teaching at the School of Visual Arts (SVA) in New York. She received more than 300 awards from international design associations as well as a series of prizes from the American Institute of Graphic Design (AIGA), The Type Directors Club (NY), New York Art Directors Club and the Package Design Council.  She is a select member of Alliance Graphique Internationale (AGI) and her work is included in the collections of New York Museum of Modern Art, the Library of Congress in Washington, D.C., the Museum für Gestaltung, Zurich and the Centre Georges Pompidou". As an artist she is known for her large-scale paintings of maps, covered with dense hand-painted labeling and information. She has taught at the School of Visual Arts in New York for over two decades, along with positions at the Cooper Union, Yale University and the Tyler School of Art.

Print 
Scher has contributed to numerous issues of Print.  Her first Print cover was with her friend Steven Heller. Together they created a parody issue in 1985, a genealogy chart of graphic design.

Television 
Scher was profiled in the first season of the Netflix docu-series Abstract: The Art of Design.

Branding & Identities Systems

The Public Theater

In 1994, Scher was the first designer to create a new identity and promotional graphics system for The Public Theater, a program that became the turning point of identity in designs that influence much of the graphic design created for theatrical promotion and for cultural institutions in general.

Based on the challenge to raise public awareness and attendance at the Public Theater along with trying to appeal to a more diverse demographic, Scher created a graphic language that reflected street typography and graffiti-like juxtaposition.  In 1995, Scher and her Pentagram team created promotional campaigns for the Public Theater's production of Savion Glover's Bring in 'da Noise, Bring in 'da Funk that featured the wood typefaces used throughout The Public Theater's identity.  Scher was inspired by Rob Ray Kelly's American Wood Types and the Victorian theater's poster when she created the cacophony of disparate wood typefaces, silhouetted photographs and bright flat colors for the theater's posters and billboard.  Scher limited her colors to two or three while highlighted the play's title and theater logo that surrounded the tap artist in a typographical be-bop.  The design was to appeal to a broad audience from the inner cities to the outer boroughs, especially those who hadn't been attracted to theater.

From 1993 to 2005, Scher worked closely with George C. Wolfe, The Public's producer and Oskar Eustis, who joined as artistic director during the fiftieth anniversary in 2005, on the development of posters, ads, and distinct identities.  As part of the anniversary campaign, the identity was redrawn using the font Akzidenz Grotesk.  The word "theater" was dropped and emphasis was placed on the word "public".  By 2008, the identity was even more definitive as it used a font called Knockout, created by Hoefler & Frere-Jones, which provided affordable and accessible productions.

The Public Theater posters:
Bring in 'da Noise, Bring in 'da Funk, Public Theater poster/Pentagram: Paula Scher/USA, 1995
Bring in 'da Noise, Bring in 'da Punch, On-Broadway poster/Pentagram: Paula Scher/USA, 1996
Bring in 'da Noise, Bring in 'da Funk, Final Season/Pentagram: Paula Scher/USA, 1997
The Public Theater's Season Print Ads, Rendered in the New Identity/Pentagram: Paula Scher/USA, 1994
HIM poster/Pentagram: Paula Scher/USA, 1994
The Diva is Dismissed/Pentagram: Paula Scher/USA, 1994
Fucking A, A Contemporary Take on The Scarlet Letter, poster/Pentagram: Paula Scher/USA, 2002

New York Shakespeare Festival in Central Park
In 1994, Scher created the first poster campaign for the New York Shakespeare Festival in Central Park production of The Merry Wives of Windsor and Two Gentlemen of Verona, and was borrowed from the tradition of old-fashioned English theater style.  This laid the foundation for the new overall identity and visual language that came to define the Public Theater for the rest of the decade and beyond.  The designs for the Shakespeare in the Park campaign were seen across New York, including buses, subways, kiosks, and billboards.

Scher's Shakespeare in the Park campaign had become a seasonal tradition in the city.  The identity has progressed over the years, and the Public Theater logo was redesigned in 2005 and 2008.  The campaign in 2008 for the productions of Hamlet and Hair utilized the strict 90 degree angles of a De Stijl-inspired grid, a pattern in Manhattan's streetscape.  The identity is like New York itself, constantly evolving.

In 2010, Scher designed the New York Shakespeare Festival in Central Park poster which presented powerful productions of The Winter's Tale and The Merchant of Venice, starring Al Pacino as Shylock.  Scher's festival promotional campaign focused on the reminiscent language in both plays by pulling lines from each production to meet in a dimensional expressive of words and typography. This campaign was awarded for Print Regional Design Annual 2011.

New York Shakespeare Festival in Central Park posters:

 New York Shakespeare Festival in Central Park: The Merry Wives of Windsor and Two Gentlemen of Verona – the first project Scher did for the Public Theater / Pentagram: Paula Scher/USA, 1994
 New York Shakespeare Festival in Central Park poster: The Tempest and Troilus and Cressida /Pentagram: Paula/USA, 1995
 New York Shakespeare Festival in Central Park poster:  Henry V and Timon of Athens / Pentagram: Paula/USA, 1996
 New York Shakespeare Festival in Central Park poster: On the Town and Henry/Pentagram: Paula/USA, 1997
 New York Shakespeare Festival in Central Park poster: Cymbeline and Thornton Wilder's Skin of Our Teeth/Pentagram: Paula/USA, 1998
 New York Shakespeare Festival in Central Park poster: The Taming of the Shrew and Tartuffe/Pentagram: Paula/USA, 1999
 New York Shakespeare Festival in Central Park poster: Winter's Tale and Julius Caesar/Pentagram: Paula/USA, 2000
 New York Shakespeare Festival in Central Park poster: Measure for Measure and The Seagull/Pentagram: Paula/USA, 2001
 New York Shakespeare Festival in Central Park poster: Henry V/ Pentagram: Paula/USA, 2003
 New York Shakespeare Festival in Central Park poster: Much Ado About Nothing/Pentagram: Paula/USA, 2004
 New York Shakespeare Festival in Central Park poster: As You Like It and Two Gentlemen of Verona/Pentagram: Paula/USA, 2005
 New York Shakespeare Festival in Central Park poster: War/Pentagram: Paula/USA, 2006
 New York Shakespeare Festival in Central Park poster: Romeo and Juliet and A Midsummer Night's Dream/Pentagram: Paula/USA, 2007
 New York Shakespeare Festival in Central Park poster: Hamlet and Hair/Pentagram: Paula/USA, 2008

The Museum of Modern Art 
The Museum of Modern Art (MoMA) has one of the most recognizable logotypes in the museum world.  In 1964, the Franklin Gothic No.2 logotype was originally designed by Ivan Chermayeff.  By 2004, Matthew Carter had redrawn a new custom typeface named MoMA Gothic.  Although MoMA's core identity is a well developed iconic museum, applications like the web, print, and physical environment have not been unified or visionary like the museum itself.  In order to continually carry the spirit of the institution, the museum hired Pentagram to design a more powerful and integrated comprehensive system.
  
To create a new approach that modernizes the institution's image, Paula Scher designed a complete methodology for the new system to work at any scale, from an exterior banner to a print advertisement in the newspaper. She designed a strong grid to uniform placement of images and types. The artwork is cropped to maximize visual impact, and each quadrant of a page or a banner has a specific function.  A particular image is selected as the signature focus for an exhibit and list of upcoming events unrelated to the featured into a text block.  The black on white logotype placed in a vertical position whenever is possible and always bleeds off an edge.

Julia Hoffman, MoMA's creative Director for Graphic and Advertising, and her internal team have used the new system and brought the system to life in applications from larger banners and subway posters to the website.

The Metropolitan Opera
Paula Scher and Julia Hoffman designed the new identity for the Metropolitan Opera.  The Metropolitan general manager, Peter Gelb, proposed to rebrand the institution and reach wide audiences like the younger generation who had never set foot inside the opera hall.  The identity was set in Baskerville and Avenir and the campaign featured a performance of Madama Butterfly.  The print ad campaign launched on August 20, 2006 and according to Thomas Michel, the Metropolitan's marketing director, it was a successful sales day in the history of the organization.

New York City Ballet
Paula Scher designed a new identity and promotional campaign for the New York City Ballet, one of the largest and well-known dance companies, founded in 1933 by Lincoln Kirstein and George Balanchine.  Scher designed with Lisa Kitchenberg of Pentagram and the NYCB's Luis Bravo, to create an identity that linked the company's legacy and location to a modern and dramatic new aesthetic.  The logo was set in the font DIN, which appears slightly stacked on each layer. The palette was composed of black, white and silvery grays, resembling how the buildings of New York appear sometimes. It has a softened transparency and a subtle gradation of color that includes shades of blue blacks, green blacks and red blacks. Scher also cropped the images of City Ballet dancers to create more tension and drama.  The new identity and graphics appeared on bus shelter, subway poster, magazines and newspapers ads, in the company's programs and website, and in environmental graphics at the New York State Theater at Lincoln Center, where the company performs.

Period Equity 
Paula Scher worked with associate designer Courtney Gooch to create the identity for Period Equity, a non-profit that is dedicated to providing affordable and safe access to menstrual products in the United States. She worked with Period Equity co-founders, Jennifer Weiss Wolf and Laura Strausfeld, to create the identity. Weiss-Wolf and Strausfeld initially wanted to call their organization "Menstrual Equality", but Scher saw Period Equity as less off-putting. The term "period" is more playful than "menstrual", and allows for more graphic options. When the organization achieves its goal, the name can be shifted to "Equity, Period". This will allow them to later extend their work beyond menstrual inequality into other issues.

Scher used the typeface New Rail Alphabet, designed by Margaret Calvert, for its neutral appearance, but replaced its square-edged punctuation with round. The branding concept puts their wordmark in between two big red dots on a white background. These dots are meant to allude to the idea of periods, but they are used in a clean and modernist style. The identity also uses copy such as "Periods are not luxuries. Period." to play with the theme. The identity is serious enough for legal work, but also loud and fun, which is necessary when discussing a topic that is normally stigmatized and seen as not appropriate to discuss in public.

Microsoft: Windows 8 logo 
In 2012, Scher created a new logo for Windows 8 that takes the logo back to its roots as a window. The logo re-imagines their older four-colour symbol as a more modern geometric shape. Early in the development process, Scher asked Microsoft, "Your name is Windows. Why are you a flag?" Although Microsoft's original brand started as a window, its graphic evolved into a flag as computing systems became more powerful. As Scher assumed, the waving flag was most likely the result of comments that a plain window looked too static with severe straight lines. The old logo was flat and drawn in motion, while the new logo can convey actual motion by suggesting dimensionality using lines receding into space. This worked better with the brand, as the name Windows was originally used as a metaphor for seeing into screens.

The logo itself is based on classical perspective drawing rather than computerized perspective. The cross bars on the window stay the same size no matter what the size of the logo is, meaning it must be redrawn for each time it increases in size. The focus on the analogy of perspective was used to convey the idea that Microsoft products are tools for individuals to achieve their goals from their own perspective. The logo design is neutral to show that it can work in many situations, and for any user. The new logo is meant to work with the Metro design language of Windows 8.

Environmental graphic designs

New Jersey Performing Arts Center
In 2000, Paula Scher designed an interior design for the New Jersey Performing Arts Center.  In the design, there are words running along the walls, tubes and balconies reflecting with vast letters that gives a joyful effect to represent the show's performance in the building. It was signature and environmental graphics for the Lucent Technologies Center for Arts Education, a school affiliated with NJPAC.

Achievement First Endeavor Middle School
For the Achievement First Endeavor Middle School at Clinton Hill, Brooklyn, a charter school for grades 5 through 8, Scher created a program of environmental graphic that helps school interiors to become a better learning environment.  She created a vibrant space with bold typography font of Rockwell and simple paint to change the life of its students.  With the help of Rogers Marvel Architects, who designed the school as a refurbishment and expansion of the existing building.  The design was based on Endeavor's teaching philosophy and a series of motivational slogans used by its teachers.  Scher enlarged these concepts into super-graphics that help define the interior spaces.  The graphics appear as an equations form ("Education = Choice", "Education = Freedom") in the hallways and quotations running around the wall of gymnasium and staircase, to encourage students to do better and create a unique environment of their own.

Paintings

The Maps
In 2006, an exhibition at Maya Stendhal gallery in New York City, Paula Scher painted two 9-by-12-foot maps that resembled patchwork quilts from afar, but contain much textual detail.  She created lines that represented the separation  of political allies or borders dividing enemies.  Scher created the maps into layers that reference what we think when we think of Japan, Kenya, or the Upper East Side.

For instance, The United States (1999) was painted in blocky white print and full with a list of facts that we comprehend when we think about cities.  Africa (2003) is represented in a stark black and white palette, hinting at a tortured colonial past.  The land of the red rising sun is represented when we think of Japan (2004).

This was Scher's first solo exhibition as a fine artist and she sold every piece between $40,000 to $135,000.  The Maya Stendhal's owner decided to extend the exhibition for four weeks, until January 21.  Therefore, Scher decided to produce silk-screened prints of The World that contained large-scale images of cities, states, and continents blanketed with place names and other information.  It is full of mistakes, misspellings, and visual allusions to stereotypes of places such as South America, painted with hot colors and has two ovaries on the sides.  It was not created to be a reliable map but convey a sense of the places that are mediated and mangled.

Scher has been described as a "maximalist", stating, "Less is more and more is more. It's the middle that's not a good place".

Scher is currently represented by Bryce Wolkowitz Gallery.

NYC Transit and Manhattan
In 2007, Paula Scher created screen-prints of NYC Transit and Manhattan that were printed on hand-made deluxe Lana Quarelle paper.  NYC Transit portrays the island of Manhattan as a busy destination crisscrossed by a subway system of loopy, color-coded lines and stations.  It also shows the Manhattan night famed neighborhoods.

Limited Edition Print Map
In 2008, Maya Stendhal released a limited edition print map of China and renowned artist Paula Scher.  The map is 48.5 x 40 inches, printed on deluxe Lanaquarelle paper, hand-made in the Vosges region of France.   Scher collaborated with Alexander Heinrici to convey the hand-painted map to represent the rapid economic growth, booming industry, the success of Olympic bid, and superpower status on China.

Personal life
In January 1970, Paula Scher met Seymour Chwast when she was a senior at the Tyler School of Art. They met through an interview at Push Pin Studios, arranged by an art director named Harris Lewine, where she took her portfolio to him.  In 1973, she and Chwast married, and divorced five years later. They remarried in 1989. Scher and Chwast live and work in New York City.

Awards
 Art Directors Club Hall of Fame 1998, Chrysler Award for Innovation in Design 2000,  AIGA Medal 2001, * National Design Award (Cooper Hewitt Smithsonian) 2013
 Honorary doctorates from Corcoran School of Art, Maryland Institute of Art and Moore College of Art
 Awards for graphic design; American Book Award nominations for best book design, and for best compilation of written and graphic material, both 1981, both for The Honeymoon Book: A Tribute to the Last Ritual of Sexual Innocence.
 The School of Visual Arts grants a Master Series Award, showcase of Make It Bigger
 Awards: Print's Regional Design Annual 2011 for Shakespeare in the Park 2010 campaign, Map Murals for Queens Metropolitan Campus, and Environmental Graphic for Parking Garage at 13-17 East 54th Street.

Books
 The Brownstone, Princeton Architectural Press, 2016.
 Scher, Paula. (2002) Make it Bigger. New York: Princeton Architectural Press, 
 Scher, Paula. (2011) Maps. New York: Princeton Architectural Press,

Book reviews
 Chwast, Seymour, and Scher, Paula. "Bookend." New York Times Book Review (1998): 55.
 Scher, Paula. "The Queen Of Howdy Doody Dada." Print 54.3 (2000): 61.

Newspaper articles

Notes

Further reading
 Helvetica (2007 film) includes an interview with Scher
 Paula Scher: Recent Exhibitions at Stendhal Gallery New York (2006–2010)
 Paula Scher bio at AIGA.org
Paula Scher bio at pentagram.com
 Paula Scher Curriculum Vitae (CV)
 Hillmancurtis feature Paula Scher: Type is Image (QuickTime)
 Art Directors Club biography, portrait and images of work
 Paula Scher: Great design is serious at TED

External links
Paula Scher: Pentagram

Paula Scher: Bryce Wolkowitz Gallery
Paual Scher: Designer at play(TED)
Paula Scher: Great design is serious at TED
 Helvetica (2007) includes an interview with Paula Scher. Helvetica Website
 https://www.moma.org/artists/7070

1948 births
Living people
People from Washington, D.C.
AIGA medalists
American graphic designers
Women graphic designers
Temple University Tyler School of Art alumni
School of Visual Arts faculty
Design educators
American women illustrators
American illustrators
American women academics
21st-century American women
Pentagram partners (past and present)